An Elephant on His Hands is a 1913 American silent short comedy film directed by Al Christie, and starring Eddie Lyons, Lee Moran, and Lon Chaney. The film is now considered lost.

Plot
Ramona is fond of pets, but her hubby, Eddie, has a horror of all animals. The parrots bite him and the monkeys bare their teeth at him. They receive a wire from Eddie's uncle saying that his circus has gone broke and that he is sending his pet elephant to Eddie to care for it. Despite his protests, Ramona sends Eddie over to the train station to pick up the beast. First, Eddie has to pay a $300 shipping bill, and then the stable he rented doesn't allow him to keep elephants there. When they try to keep the creature in their backyard, neighbors complain and authorities order it removed. The last scene shows the elephant dragging a furniture van with Ramona sitting up on top of it and Eddie leading the procession.

Cast
 Lon Chaney as Eddie
 Ramona Langley
 Eddie Lyons
 Lee Moran

Reception
Moving Picture World opined "In this comedy, it is probable that most of the fun will come from the antics of the animals, two of which are featured -- a monkey and an elephant. The osculatory feats of the former are bound to convulse any house."

References

External links

1913 films
1913 comedy films
1913 short films
1913 lost films
Silent American comedy films
American silent short films
American black-and-white films
Films directed by Al Christie
Lost American films
Universal Pictures short films
American comedy short films
Lost comedy films
1910s American films